Afghanistan–Denmark relations refers to bilateral relations between Afghanistan and Denmark. Afghanistan is represented in Denmark through its embassy in Oslo, Norway. Denmark used to have an embassy in Kabul until it was closed in 2021. Denmark has 760 soldiers in Afghanistan, operating without caveat and concentrated in Helmand Province. Relations between the two countries are friendly. About 9578 Afghans live in Denmark.

Diplomatic relations were established in 1947. On 24 May 1967, an air service agreement was signed in Kabul. On 2 March 1979, an agreement on a Danish loan to Afghanistan was signed.

Danish military in Afghanistan

Since 2001, the Royal Danish Army has been involved in the War in Afghanistan as part of the ISAF. The Royal Danish Army with the British Army have been involved in clashes with the Taliban in the Helmand Province. Denmark had two of their F 16s in the Manas Air Base, Kyrgyzstan to support their forces in Afghanistan.

Assistance
Danish Committee for Aid to Afghan Refugees is an organization, working in Afghanistan. The organization was created to support the Afghans, who had fled to Pakistan and Iran. Danish assistance to Afghanistan amounts $80 million each year. Since the fall of the Taleban in 2001, Denmark has supported Afghanistan with education and democratisation. In 2005, the Folketing approved 670 million DKK, to the rebuilding of Afghanistan.

During a visit to Afghanistan in November 2012, Danish Minister for Development Cooperation Christian Friis Bach declared that his government pledged US$100m in aid over the next 5 years.

High level visits
On 28 January 2006, the Afghan president Hamid Karzai visited Anders Fogh Rasmussen in Marienborg, the summer residence of the Danish Prime Minister. In September 2009, Danish Prime Minister Anders Fogh Rasmussen visited Camp Bastion.
On 23 June 2010, Danish Prime Minister Lars Løkke Rasmussen visited Afghanistan, where he met Hamid Karzai. On 10 January 2011, Afghan Foreign Minister Zalmai Rassoul visited Denmark, to discuss bilateral relations.

See also
 Danish Committee for Aid to Afghan Refugees

References

External links
Rasmus Mariager og Anders Wivel. 2019. Hvorfor gik Danmark i krig? University of Copenhagen.

 

 
Denmark
Bilateral relations of Denmark